Väimela Alajärv is a lake in Võru County of eastern Estonia.

See also
List of lakes of Estonia

Lakes of Estonia
Võru Parish
Lakes of Võru County